Atotonilco is the name of several towns in Mexico.

Atotonilco may refer to:

Sanctuary of Atotonilco, Guanajuato, near San Miguel de Allende
Atotonilco de Tula, Hidalgo
Atotonilco El Alto, Jalisco
Atotonilco El Grande, Hidalgo
Atotonilco el Bajo, Jalisco